The Prospect League is a collegiate summer baseball league comprising teams of college players from North America and beyond. All players in the league must have NCAA eligibility remaining in order to participate. So as to maintain their college eligibility, players are not paid. Beginning in 2012, the league added four games to the season, making a total of 60 games per team (30 home and 30 road).

League history

Origin
In 1963, the Central Illinois Collegiate League (CICL), the precursor league to the Prospect league, was formed as a charter member of the National Collegiate Athletic Association (NCAA) summer collegiate baseball program. The league existed under NCAA rules and guidance for 41 years. In 2005, the NCAA ended its official association with summer collegiate baseball; however, the CICL continued to preserve the amateur status of its member athletes by abiding by the rules and regulations of the National Alliance of College Summer Baseball (NACSB). In 2009, the CICL planned to expand to six teams by adding the Hannibal Cavemen, but in winter 2008, the league ownership voted against further expansion.

Dr. Chris Hanners, owner of the Chillicothe franchise and one of the founders of the independent professional Frontier League, wanted to keep a Paints baseball team in Chillicothe. Dr. Hanners, Leo Trich, former Frontier league director of development; General Manager and majority owner of the Butler BlueSox, and Duke Ward, former owner of the Frontier League's Richmond Roosters worked with the ownership of the CICL to form the Prospect League.

The Prospect League began its inaugural season in summer 2009 with the original CICL teams forming the Western Division. Five expansion teams formed the Eastern Division. Three of the Eastern Division teams began play in markets previously served by Frontier League teams. Besides the Chillicothe Paints, the Richmond RiverRats (Richmond, Indiana) played in the previous home of the Frontier League's Richmond Roosters, which are now the Traverse City Beach Bums. The Slippery Rock Sliders (Slippery Rock, Pennsylvania) played in the previous home of the Frontier League team of the same name.

2010 expansion
In 2010, the Prospect League expanded adding four new franchises: the Terre Haute Rex (Terre Haute, Indiana), the West Virginia Miners (Beckley, West Virginia), the DeKalb County Liners (Sycamore, Illinois), and the Nashville Outlaws (Nashville, Tennessee).

Due to a change in team ownership in 2010, the North Coast Knights became the Lorain County Ironmen.

2011 and 2012 team departures
In 2011 the DuPage Dragons franchise folded after five years with the CICL (2006–08) and Prospect League (2009–10). As a result, the league returned to a 2-division format after having 3 divisions in 2010. Richmond was moved to the six-team Eastern Division, while Danville, Nashville, Terre Haute, and Dubois County were moved to the eight-team Western Division.

Before the 2012 season, the Nashville Outlaws folded, and the DeKalb County Liners left the league to join the Midwest Collegiate League, leaving the Prospect League with twelve teams in two, six-team divisions. The 2012 schedule consisted of 60 games with no "cross-over" games; with all games played among teams from the same division only. The only time teams from opposite divisions meet is in the Championship Series.

Expansion into New York
For the 2015 season, the league added its easternmost team yet, the Jamestown Jammers (Jamestown, New York). The Kokomo Jackrabbits (Kokomo, Indiana) were also added to the league to play in the new Kokomo Municipal Stadium, set to open for the 2015 season. After the 2015 season, the Richmond RiverRats folded, and the Jamestown Jammers moved to the Perfect Game Collegiate Baseball League after just one season in the Prospect League.

Lafayette and DuPage join the league
The league stayed at 12 total teams for the 2016 season by adding the new Lafayette Aviators (Lafayette, Indiana) and DuPage Drones (Lisle, Illinois).

2017 contraction
For the 2017 season, the league contracted to 10 teams, as the Hannibal Cavemen and DuPage Drones both ceased operation.
Hannibal reentered the league for the 2018 season as the Hannibal Hoots.

2019 expansion and reorganization
The league returned to a twelve team league for the 2019 season with the addition of the Cape Catfish in Cape Girardeau, Missouri, the departure of the Kokomo Jackrabbits to the Northwoods League, the addition of the Normal CornBelters from the Frontier League and the addition of the DuPage Pistol Shrimp in Lisle, Illinois.

The 2019 league featured two divisions, each with six teams. The West Division consisted of the Cape Catfish, DuPage Pistol Shrimp, Hannibal Hoots, Normal CornBelters, Quincy Gems and the Springfield Sliders. The East Division consisted of the Champion City Kings, Chillicothe Paints, Danville Dans, Lafayette Aviators, Terre Haute REX and the West Virginia Miners.

2020 season cancellation
On May 29, 2020, the Prospect League announced cancellation of the 2020 season due to the COVID-19 pandemic. In January 2020, the league announced adding a new team in Alton, Illinois for the 2021 season. In September 2020, the league announced adding a new team in Johnstown, Pennsylvania for the 2021 season.

2021 expansion 
In February 2021, the league announced the addition of two new teams in Iowa, the Clinton LumberKings and Burlington Bees. Both teams are former Midwest League teams displaced in the 2021 realignment of the minor leagues.

2023 expansion 
In December 2021, the league announced the addition of the Jackson Rockabillys for the 2023 season, playing home games in Jackson, Tennessee at West Tennessee Baseball Stadium (formerly known as The Ballpark at Jackson). In August 2022, the league announced that a Southern Illinois team would begin play in 2023 at Rent One Park in Marion, Illinois; in February 2023, the team was named the Thrillville Thrillbillies. The league announced that the West Virginia Miners would be dormant for the 2023 season.

Members

Current members 

 * Former professional baseball team
 ^ Former professional baseball venue
Charter members: Butler BlueSox, Champion City Kings (as the Slippery Rock Sliders), Chillicothe Paints, Danville Dans, DuPage Dragons, Hannibal Cavemen, Richmond RiverRats, Springfield Sliders, Quincy Gems

Dormant members

Former members 

The Cape Catfish, DuPage Pistol Shrimp and Normal CornBelters joined the league in the 2019, replacing the Kokomo Jackrabbits, who left for the Northwoods League, and the Butler BlueSox, who suspended operations.

Division and League Champions

Playoff format 
2009: After 56-game schedule, teams with best record in each division faced each other in a best-of-three series for the Championship.

2010: 56-game schedule divided in two halves. Winners from each half in each division faced each other in a one-game playoff (home field to team with best overall record). Where the same team won both halves in a division, the team with the next-best overall record from that division was declared the wild card. Championship Series was a two-game affair with the divisional playoff winner with the best overall record receiving a bye into the Championship Game. The remaining two divisional playoff winners met in a one-game play-in for the right to go to the Championship Game. Championship Series held at Chillicothe, Ohio.

Teams in italics qualified for that season's playoffs as a wild card entry under that particular season's playoff format.

2011: 56-game schedule divided in two halves. Winners from each half in each division faced each other in a one-game playoff (home field to team winning the first half). Where the same team won both halves in a division, the team with the next-best overall record from that division was declared the wild card. Divisional playoff winners met in one-game playoff with home field awarded to the team with the best overall record from the regular season.

2012: 60-game schedule divided in two halves. Winners from each half in each division to face each other in a one-game playoff to be hosted by the first-half champions in each division. If the same team wins both halves, the team with the best overall record from that division will be declared the wild card. Winners of each divisional playoff game will meet in a best-of-three Championship Series, with home advantage given to the division that wins the annual All-Star Game (to be held in Butler, PA). Game One of the Championship Series will be played at the home field of the team from the losing division at the All-Star Game, with Game Two and Game Three (if necessary) held at the home field of the team from the winning division at the All-Star Game.

2013–2016: 60-game schedule divided into two halves. Winners from each half in each division to face each other in a best-of-three with game one being held at second-half winner and games two and three (if necessary) at home of first-half winner. There are no travel days in the Division Series. Each division champion plays in the best-of-three Prospect League Championship Series. Game one is held at the home of the team representing the division that lost that year's All-Star Game. Games two and three (if necessary) are held at the home of the team representing the division that won that year's All-Star Game.

2017–present: After a 60-game schedule, the top two teams in the East Division and the West Division play each other in the first round in a best of 3 series with the first place teams getting home field advantage. The winner of the East Division and West Division series face off in a best-of-three Prospect League Championship series with the team with the best record getting home field advantage.

Championship results

Awards

Mike Schmidt Award winners (Player of the Year)

Pitcher of the Year Award winners

References

External links
Prospect League
Google Map of the Prospect League teams

Summer baseball leagues
2008 establishments in the United States
College baseball leagues in the United States
Sports leagues established in 2008
 
Baseball leagues in Illinois
Baseball leagues in Ohio
Baseball leagues in Missouri
Baseball leagues in Indiana
Baseball leagues in West Virginia
Baseball leagues in Iowa
Baseball leagues in Pennsylvania